Białostocki may refer to:

Białostocki, meaning "of Bialystok" is used in Polish names for various locations, such as powiat białostocki for Białystok County, Poland
Jan Białostocki (1921-1988), Polish historian
Gabriel Białostocki, or Gabriel of Białystok, (1684-1690),  a child saint in the Russian Orthodox Church, the victim of a murder which served as a base for a blood libel 
Zygmunt Białostocki (1897-1942), Polish Jewish musician and composer